Padakuthira is a 1978 Indian Malayalam-language film, directed by P. G. Vasudevan and produced by Malithra Production. The film stars Kamal Haasan, Mallika Sukumaran, R. S. Manohar and Meena. The film has musical score by Kannur Rajan. Kamal Haasan and M. S. Viswanathan sang the songs "Ragalolayaay Kamalolayaay Neelayaamini" and "Paapam Nizhal" respectively in the film album.

Cast 
 Kamal Haasan
 Mallika Sukumaran
 R. S. Manohar
 Meena
 Ravikumar
 Seema

Production 
Padakkuthira film directed by P. G. Vasudevan, produced by M. O. Devasia under production banner Malithra Enterprises. It was given an "U" (Unrestricted) certificate by the Central Board of Film Certification.

Soundtrack
The music was composed by Kannur Rajan with lyrics by Mankombu Gopalakrishnan.

References

External links
 

1978 films
1970s Malayalam-language films